Kovrig is a surname. Notable people with the surname include:

Ákos Kovrig (born 1982), Hungarian footballer
Michael Kovrig, Canadian diplomat